Ahmed Dawouda (born 25 June 1989), also transliterated Daouda or Dawooda, is an Egyptian footballer who plays for Egyptian Premier League side Al Mokawloon Al Arab, as an attacking midfielder.

Honours

Zamalek
Egypt Cup (1): 2017–18

References

External links
 
 

1989 births
Living people
People from Monufia Governorate
Egyptian footballers
Association football midfielders
Egyptian Premier League players
Gomhoriat Shebin SC players
Kategoria Superiore players
Egypt international footballers
Egyptian expatriate footballers
Expatriate footballers in Albania
KF Skënderbeu Korçë players
Al Masry SC players
Ismaily SC players
Wadi Degla SC players
Misr Lel Makkasa SC players
Zamalek SC players
Al Ittihad Alexandria Club players
Tala'ea El Gaish SC players
Al Mokawloon Al Arab SC players